Earth and Sun and Moon is the eighth studio album by Australian rock group, Midnight Oil, that was released in April 1993 under the Columbia Records label. It peaked at No.2 on the ARIA Albums Chart.

Background
Midnight Oil's Earth and Sun and Moon album, produced with Nick Launay, was released in April 1993 and peaked at No. 2 on the ARIA Albums Chart, top 20 in Sweden and Switzerland, top 50 on Billboard 200, and top 30 in the UK albums chart. The single "Truganini" referenced multiple issues, including the 'last' Tasmanian Aboriginal, the treatment of indigenous artist Albert Namatjira, the Australian flag debate, and republicanism. Liner notes for the single claimed "Truganini was the sole surviving Tasmanian Aborigine, the last of her race, when she died in 1876." The Tasmanian Aboriginal Centre, representing over 7000 contemporary Tasmanians, called for the single to be boycotted as it perpetuated a 'white' myth about the extinction of Tasmanian Aborigines. Their Native Title claims hinged upon establishing links with ancestral lands. Gary Morris, their manager, responded with, "My suggestion to these people is to stop shooting themselves in the foot and let a band like Midnight Oil voice its appeal to White Australia on behalf of Black Australia". Critics contended that Morris disparaged Indigenous Australians' ability to represent themselves and overestimated Midnight Oil's ambassadorial powers while diminishing their errors, while some indigenous activists saw benefit in Midnight Oil's highlighting of the issues. Nevertheless, "Truganini" released in March peaked at No. 10 on the ARIA singles charts, No. 10 on Billboard Mainstream Rock Tracks and No. 4 on their Modern Rock Tracks charts, and top 30 for the UK charts.

Reception

Tom Demalon of AllMusic remarked, "If Earth and Sun and Moon isn't Midnight Oil's best effort, it's certainly close. The band still sticks to themes that are close to its heart -- the environment, native peoples, and other social causes -- but rarely has it managed to fashion an album full of songs that are as musically intoxicating."

Track listing

Charts

Weekly charts

Year-end charts

Certifications

Personnel
Midnight Oil
 Peter Garrett – lead vocals, harmonica
 Bones Hillman – bass guitar, vocals
 Rob Hirst – drums, vocals
 Jim Moginie – guitar, keyboards, vocals
 Martin Rotsey – guitar

Recording details
 Producer – Nick Launay, Midnight Oil
 Engineer – Brent Clark, Nick Launay
 Mastering – Tony Cousins
 Mixing – Nick Launay

Artwork
 Design – Kevin Wilkins, Craig Simmons, Midnight Oil

References

External links
 Earth Sun and Moon FAQ from oil base
 Midnight Oil

Midnight Oil albums
Sprint Music albums
1993 albums
Albums produced by Nick Launay
Columbia Records albums